RuPaul's Drag Race, an American reality competition television program, premiered in 2009 and documents host RuPaul's search for "America's Next Drag Superstar". Its success has led to the creation of a franchise including RuPaul's Drag Race All Stars, international spin-off series including British and Australian and New Zealand versions hosted by RuPaul; Chilean, Thai, Canadian, Dutch, Spanish, Italian, French, Philippine, and Belgian editions; upcoming Swedish, Mexican, German, and Brazilian installments; and international "vs. the World" competitions hosted in the UK and Canada. 196 contestants have appeared on the original American series over fourteen seasons; 63 past contestants have returned to compete on All Stars; and 262 contestants have appeared across the international iterations of the show.

The original series has crowned fourteen winners, awarding them the title of "America's Next Drag Superstar": BeBe Zahara Benet, Tyra Sanchez, Raja Gemini, Sharon Needles, Jinkx Monsoon, Bianca Del Rio, Violet Chachki, Bob the Drag Queen, Sasha Velour, Aquaria, Yvie Oddly, Jaida Essence Hall, Symone, and Willow Pill.

In addition, in seven seasons of All Stars, seven queens have won entry into the "Drag Race Hall of Fame"—Chad Michaels, Alaska, Trixie Mattel, Monét X Change, Trinity the Tuck, Shea Couleé, Kylie Sonique Love—and  one, Jinkx Monsoon, has been crowned the "Queen of All Queens", becoming the first contestant to win two different seasons in the franchise.

Most competitors have been cisgender gay men, although several contestants came out as trans women on the show, while others entered the competition already out and at various stages in their transitions. Monica Beverly Hillz, who came out as a trans woman during season 5, said in a 2013 interview that the show does not require contestants to identify as male and that transgender women can participate if they consider themselves drag artists. However, in 2018, RuPaul told The Guardian that he would "probably not" allow a transgender contestant who had "really transitioned" to compete and later compared transgender drag performers to doping athletes. RuPaul has since apologized for those comments.

Kylie Sonique Love, who made history as the first contestant to come out as trans on the show, during the season 2 reunion episode, became the first out trans woman to win a U.S. version of the show when she was inducted into the "Hall of Fame" in All Stars 6. On season 13, Gottmik became the first trans man to compete on the show. On UK series 3, Victoria Scone became the first cis woman to compete on the show. On season 14, Maddy Morphosis became the first straight man to compete.

, Jujubee has appeared more than any other contestant on Drag Race, competing on four different seasons: season 2, All Stars 1, All Stars 5, and UK vs the World. Several other queens have competed on three seasons, including Shangela (the first to do so), Latrice Royale, Manila Luzon, Gia Gunn, Alexis Mateo, Eureka!, Ginger Minj, Pandora Boxx, Yara Sofia, Mo Heart, Monét X Change, Shea Couleé, Trinity the Tuck, Ra'Jah O'Hara, and Silky Nutmeg Ganache.

, three previous contestants have died. Season 2 contestant Sahara Davenport died of heart failure on October 1, 2012, at age 27. Davenport was in a long-term relationship with season 3 contestant Manila Luzon at the time. Season 8 and All Stars 3 contestant Chi Chi DeVayne died of complications from scleroderma and pneumonia on August 20, 2020, at age 34. UK series 2 contestant Cherry Valentine died on September 18, 2022, at age 28.

U.S. seasons
Ages, names, and cities stated are at time of filming.

Legend

† indicates that the contestant is deceased.

RuPaul's Drag Race

RuPaul's Drag Race All Stars

 

RuPaul's Drag Race All Stars, a spin-off series in which past contestants return to compete for a spot in the Drag Race "Hall of Fame", premiered in 2012.

As of 2022, ten contestants have competed in more than one season of All Stars. From All Stars 1, Manila Luzon and Latrice Royale, "Team Latrila", returned to All Stars 4 to compete as individual contestants; Jujubee and Alexis Mateo returned to All Stars 5; and Yara Sofia and Pandora Boxx returned to All Stars 6. Ginger Minj, from All Stars 2, also returned to All Stars 6, making it the first season to feature more than two previous All Stars and becoming the first contestant from a season other than All Stars 1 to return. Monét X Change, Trinity the Tuck and Shea Couleé, winners of All Stars 4 and 5, returned to All Stars 7, the first ever season to exclusively feature winners of previous seasons.

All Stars 7 also featured The Vivienne, winner of the first series of RuPaul’s Drag Race UK, becoming the first American season to feature a queen from an international franchise.

RuPaul's Secret Celebrity Drag Race
RuPaul's Secret Celebrity Drag Race is a spin-off show which premiered April 24, 2020 on VH1. It featured a total of 12 celebrities over four episodes and were mentored by returning RuPaul's Drag Race contestants with their drag transformation. The winner of each episode gets to donate the prize to a charity of their choice which raised $210,000 across 11 various charities. The second season consisted of nine celebrities competing weekly in "Lip Sync Extravanganza" for the chance to win $100,000 for their charity of choice.

RuPaul's Drag Race Holi-slay Spectacular 
RuPaul's Drag Race Holi-slay Spectacular is a holiday television special, which aired on VH1 on December 7, 2018.

RuPaul's Drag U
From 2010 to 2012, Logo aired a spin-off to Drag Race entitled RuPaul's Drag U. The series saw members of the public receive drag-inspired makeovers from selected memorable contestants from Drag Race.

International seasons 
Ages, names, and cities stated are at time of filming.

Legend

† indicates that the contestant is deceased.

Canada's Drag Race 

Canada's Drag Race premiered in 2020.

Canada's Drag Race: Canada vs. the World

Canada's Drag Race: Canada vs. the World premiered in November 2022. It is the second season, following UK vs the World,
to feature returning contestants from across the international installments of the Drag Race franchise. It was the fourth season, following The Switch 2, All Stars 3, and All Stars 7, to feature a previous Drag Race winner returning to compete again. Ra'Jah O'Hara and Silky Nutmeg Ganache, who previously appeared on season 11 and All Stars 6, are the first pair of contestants to appear together across three different seasons.

Drag Race Belgique
Drag Race Belgique premiered in 2023.

Drag Race España 

Drag Race España premiered in 2021.

Drag Race France 
Drag Race France premiered in 2022.

Drag Race Holland 

Drag Race Holland premiered in 2020.

Drag Race Italia 
Drag Race Italia premiered in 2021.

Drag Race Philippines 
Drag Race Philippines premiered in 2022.

Drag Race Sverige 
Drag Race Sverige premiered on March 4, 2023.

Drag Race Thailand 

Drag Race Thailand premiered in 2018.

RuPaul's Drag Race Down Under
RuPaul's Drag Race Down Under premiered in 2021.

RuPaul's Drag Race UK

RuPaul's Drag Race UK premiered in 2019.

RuPaul's Drag Race: UK vs the World

RuPaul's Drag Race: UK vs the World premiered in 2022 on BBC Three. Like All Stars, this season featured previous contestants returning to compete again but, in a first for the franchise, contestants from different international versions were represented.

The Switch Drag Race
The Switch Drag Race premiered in 2015. The first season featured contestants who were based in Chile. The second season featured Spanish-speaking contestants from around the world, including two competitors who had previously appeared on the original American version of the show.

Notes

See also
 List of drag queens

References

American television-related lists
RuPaul
RuPaul's Drag Race contestants

Contestants